Urban FM is an alternative radio station which broadcasts 24 hours from Pristina, Kosovo on FM frequency 103.5. It is widely regarded amongst young people of Kosovo as a station with both good music and various interesting programs.  Besides its normal activity as a radio station, Urban FM has  taken part in various social awareness campaigns  that were held in Kosovo.

References

External links
Urban FM Website
Listen Urban FM online

Radio stations in Kosovo
Mass media in Pristina